Nefedikha is a rural locality (a village) in Velikodvorskoye Rural Settlement, Totemsky  District, Vologda Oblast, Russia. The population was 7 as of 2002.

Geography 
Nefedikha is located 46 km southwest of Totma (the district's administrative centre) by road. Davydikha is the nearest rural locality.

References 

Rural localities in Tarnogsky District